Pearl Light may refer to:

, a Hong Kong-registered cargo ship in service 1964–66
Pearl Light, a beer brewed by the Pearl Brewing Company of San Antonio, Texas, US

See also
Perlite, an amorphous volcanic glass
Pearlite, a two-phased structure in steel